Bayou Meto is an unincorporated community in Lonoke County, Arkansas, United States. The community is located south of Lonoke.

References

Unincorporated communities in Lonoke County, Arkansas
Unincorporated communities in Arkansas
Arkansas placenames of Native American origin